Harvey Ward (born 1966/1967) is an American politician and the mayor of Gainesville, Florida. Ward has lived in Gainesville his whole life and occupied the position of city commissioner from 2017 to 2023.

Early life and education 
Ward attended Eastside High School and graduated in 1985. He then enrolled at Santa Fe College in Gainesville, and eventually graduated from the University of Florida with a bachelor's degree in public relations. Ward is married to Gillian Lord, the Associate Dean of the University of Florida's College of Liberal Arts and Sciences. Together, they have three daughters. Ward previously served as the Executive Director of the Holy Trinity Episcopal Foundation, and in several positions at WUFT-TV/FM. Ward has served on the Gainesville City Commission since 2017.

Electoral history 
Harvey Ward was elected to district 2 of the Gainesville City Commission in 2017, narrowly avoiding a run-off. He was re-elected in 2020 with more than two-thirds of the vote. Term-limits prevented Ward from running for a third term. He ran to be mayor of Gainesville and was elected by more than 5,000 votes. Despite being elected in a nonpartisan election, Ward is a registered Democrat.

Ward defeated Bielarski in the mayoral runoff, and will be the mayor of Gainesville from 2022 to 2025. He will go on to replace incumbent mayor Lauren Poe.

Ward and Bielarski advance to a runoff election, defeating 7 other candidates.

Ward defeated Walle in the two-way primary race, winning reelection in district 2.

Ward secured a narrow majority in his first city commission election, avoiding a runoff.

Ward's first election took place in 2014, where he lost to incumbent county commissioner Lee Pinkoson in the Democratic primary.

References 

Living people
1960s births